Valentino Mastrozzi  (born 24 July 1729 in Terni, Italy, died 13 May 1809 in Rome) was a cardinal of the Catholic Church, and was a member of the Roman Curia.

He was named cardinal in February 1801 by Pope Pius VII.

References

19th-century Italian cardinals
1729 births
1809 deaths
People from Terni
Cardinals created by Pope Pius VII